Upma, uppumavu, or uppittu is a dish originating from the Indian subcontinent, most common in Kerala, Andhra Pradesh, Tamil Nadu, Telangana, Karnataka, Maharashtrian, and Sri Lankan Tamil breakfast, cooked as a thick porridge from dry-roasted semolina or coarse rice flour. Various seasonings and/ vegetables are often added during the cooking, depending on individual preferences.

Etymology
The different names for the dish derive from the combinations of word uppu, meaning salt in Tamil and  mavu means ground grain meal in Tamil. In North India, the dish is called upma. In Maharashtra the dish traditionally had the name saanja in Marathi.

Ingredients and preparation
Upma is typically made by first lightly dry roasting semolina (called rava or sooji in India). The semolina is then taken off the fire and kept aside while spices, lentils, onion, ginger, etc are sautéed in oil or ghee. The semolina is then added back to the pan and mixed thoroughly. Boiling water is added, and the mixture is stirred until the semolina absorbs the liquid and becomes fluffy in texture.

There are several ways in which upma is made, and the variations are obtained by either adding or removing spices and vegetables. The texture can vary significantly as well, depending on how much water is added to it, and how long the mixture is allowed to remain on the flame thereafter.

Major variations

Semolina upma

The most popular version with wide variations of upma are made with whole or refined ground semolina made out of durum wheat. Sometimes a wide range of vegetables may be added, and may be garnished with a variety of beans (raw or sprouted), cashew and peanuts.  For a variation called masala upma (known as kharabath in Karnataka), sambar masala or garam masala is added along with red chilli powder, instead of green chillies. This variety is more popular in Karnataka, Maharastra, Tamil Nadu and parts of Andhra Pradesh and is usually served in South Indian restaurants. Uppumavu paired with hand mashed banana is a common breakfast item in Kerala homes.

Whole wheat upma

Whole wheat or wheat dalia (cracked wheat) is a common variation of upma in Tamil Nadu, where it is eaten for breakfast or dinner. Sometimes it is cooked with vegetables like peas, carrots, and beans.

Upma Pesarattu 
Upma Pesarattu is the most popular version in Andhra Pradesh, Yanam and Telangana. The dish contains Upma and Pesarattu combined. The upma is eaten by wrapping it in the Pesarattu.

Rice upma

Rice upma, which is mainly popular in Tamil Nadu and southern parts of Karnataka, is referred to as akki tari uppittu (rice coarse flour uppittu). Another variant of upma is prepared with grated coconut instead of onions, especially on holy days, when onion is avoided. This type of upma is generally smeared with ghee at the end of preparation. Dishes similar to upma can be made by substituting small crumbs of leftover bread or idli instead of flour. Upma made from coarser rava known as sajjige is a dish of Udupi cuisine. It is sometimes served along with snacks such as sautéed and spiced poha or chevdo.

Corn upma

Another variation, particularly as a breakfast dish, is corn upma, eaten with milk and nuts.

Kesari bhath
In Karnataka, upma is also served with another common sweet dish of Karnataka, kesari bhath (ಕೇಸರಿ ಬಾತ್), with a scoop of each on one plate, in a presentation commonly called "chow chow bath".

Aval upma/Atukula upma
In Kerala & Andhra Pradesh, upma made with flattened rice in substitution to semolina this dish is popularly called as Aval upmavu in Malayalam (അവൽ ഉപ്പുമാവ്) & Atukulu upma (అటుకులు ఉప్మా) in Telugu. This variant is also known as aval upma in the Chennai region when made with rice flakes similar to poha.

Vermicelli upma

A popular light evening snack is upma made with vermicelli and tomato, peas and carrot.

Upma served with ghugni
In most parts of Odisha, a popular breakfast consists of sooji upma served with ghugni.

See also
 List of porridges
 Broken rice
 Couscous
 
how to cook upma

References

South Indian cuisine
Karnataka cuisine
Telangana cuisine
Tamil cuisine
Andhra cuisine
Porridges
Kerala cuisine
Sri Lankan porridges